Las Rozas Club de Fútbol is a Spanish football club based in Las Rozas de Madrid, in the autonomous Community of Madrid. Founded in 1966 it plays in Tercera Federación – Group 7, holding home games at Polideportivo Dehesa de Navalcarbón, which has a capacity of 3,000 spectators.

History 
Club Deportivo Las Rozas was founded in 1966, with the intention of promoting sport in the town. Six years later it reformed as a club, in order to compete with other professional teams in the Community of Madrid.  On September 1, 1971 the club was registered in the Castilian Federation. 

In the 1991–92 season Las Rozas reached the fourth division for the first time, remaining in that level for the following 18 years. From 2000 to 2002 it managed to finish second in the regular season, and won its group in 2004–05, always falling short in the subsequent promotion playoffs.

In 2009, after a merger with Unión Las Rozas, the team was renamed Las Rozas Club de Fútbol.
Sports Director: Oscar Cornejo Maestre Jacobo went on to take over the club in 2011, with a salary of €4,000 / month under the motto "Fellowship Yes" from its self-proclamation, the club has gone on to have a single worker staff (himself).

Season to season

2 season in Segunda División B
19 seasons in Tercera División

Current squad

Honours
Tercera División: 2004–05

Stadium
Las Rozas plays at Polideportivo Municipal Dehesa de Navalcarbón, whose main football field has an athletics track, and a capacity of about 3,000 spectators.

Famous players
 Álvaro Mejía (youth)
 Marcos Llorente (youth)
 Munir (youth)
 Marcos Gullón 
 Loïc Badiashile

Notable managers
 Lolo Escobar
 Guillermo Fernández Romo

Other projects
Las Rozas collaborated with non-governmental organization Africa Live, providing material aid and a football team in Malawi.

References

External links
Official website 
Futbolme team profile 

Football clubs in the Community of Madrid
Association football clubs established in 1966
1966 establishments in Spain
Las Rozas de Madrid